The Hoge Heren (English: High Gentlemen) is hybrid complex composed of two towers in the center of Rotterdam designed by Wiel Arets, located in the former Zalmhaven of the city near the Erasmusbrug. The building was completed in 2000. The complex is 102 meters high and has 35 floors.

References

Residential buildings completed in 2000
Buildings and structures in Rotterdam